Milo is a ghost town in Lincoln County, Kansas, United States.

History
Milo was issued a post office in 1872. The post office was discontinued in 1938.

The 1912 cyclopedia of Kansas describes Milo as a "country trading point" on Atchison, Topeka and Santa Fe Railway, with "2 stores, an express office, and a money order postoffice with one rural route."  It reported the 1910 population to be 50 people.

The referenced rail line opened in 1888 as a line of the Chicago, Kansas and Western Railroad opened from Manchester, Kansas in the east to Barnard in the west, a 43 mile line, with a stop at Milo.  The Atchison, Topeka and Santa Fe Railway the line in 1901.  An application was filed in 1983 to abandon this "Minneapolis District" line.The Minneapolis District, Abandoned Rails, Retrieved 21 February 2022

References

Former populated places in Lincoln County, Kansas
Former populated places in Kansas